Edwin Yobani Ávila Martínez (born October 26, 1976 in La Ceiba) is a Honduran football defender who currently plays for Platense in the Liga Nacional de Honduras.

Club career
Nicknamed Zancudo Ávila has played a large part of his career for Olimpia in Liga Nacional de Honduras. He also had spells with  Platense and Real España as well as in Guatemala with Zacapa.

In summer 2011 he announced to leave Real España while still on a six months contract after receiving an offer from Olimpia but España did not have the intention to let him go. In the end he had to return to España after a transfer to Olimpia or a foreign club did not materialise. Espana then decided to sack him and he joined Victoria for the 2011 Apertura.

In December 2011 he announced he would play the 2012 Clausura for Marathón. He rejoined Platense for the 2012 Apertura.

International career
Ávila made his debut for Honduras aged 34 in a December 2010 friendly match against Panama which proved to be his only international game.

Personal life
Born in La Ceiba, he now lives in Puerto Cortes. He is the son of former Honduran Olympic footballer Victoria Óscar García and the half-brother of national team winger Oscar Boniek García and former Motagua player Samir García.

References

External links

1976 births
Living people
People from La Ceiba
Association football defenders
Honduran footballers
Honduras international footballers
C.D. Olimpia players
Platense F.C. players
Deportivo Zacapa players
Real C.D. España players
C.D. Victoria players
C.D. Marathón players
Liga Nacional de Fútbol Profesional de Honduras players
Honduran expatriate footballers
Expatriate footballers in Guatemala